William Beaumont (1785–1853) was a U.S. Army surgeon.

William Beaumont may also refer to:
Bill Beaumont (born 1952), English rugby player
William Beaumont, 2nd Viscount Beaumont (1438–1507), English soldier and landowner
William Spencer Beaumont, British army officer and a member of the London County Council
William Comyns Beaumont (1873–1956), British journalist, author, and lecturer
William Beaumont (1427–1453), lord of the manor of Shirwell in North Devon
William Rawlins Beaumont (1803–1875), Canadian surgeon
Billy Beaumont (1883–1911), English footballer

See also
William de Beaumont, 3rd Earl of Warwick (1140–1184)
William Beaumont Army Medical Center a U.S. Army medical center in El Paso, Texas, United States
William Beaumont Health System, a not-for-profit operator of 3 hospitals in U.S. state of Michigan